The second season of The Masked Singer Australia was renewed in October 2019 and premiered on Monday, 10 August 2020. Osher Günsberg returned as the show's host. In the Grand Finale on 14 September 2020, Bonnie Anderson (as “Bushranger”)  was crowned as the winner, Kate Miller-Heidke (as “Queen”) was the runner-up, and Eddie Perfect (as “Frillneck”) placed third.

Production
The costumes were designed and created by Australian Academy Award and BAFTA Award-Winning costume designer Tim Chappel, who is best known for his work on The Adventures of Priscilla, Queen of the Desert with Lizzy Gardiner.

Impact of the COVID-19 pandemic

As a result of the COVID-19 pandemic, the in studio audience consisted of socially-distanced production staff wearing costumes. Additionally, a small number of Australian viewers that were selected to act as a virtual audience. The virtual audience streamed the live performances online while the show was produced and voted for their favourite character's performances. The performer with the fewest votes by the virtual audience was unmasked in each episode. For confidentiality, the virtual audience did not witness the elimination's result or the unmasking of the performers.

Production of The Masked Singer was suspended on 22 August 2020 after a crew member tested positive to COVID-19, with 16 confirmed cases connected to the show. All production staff, judges and singers were placed in self-isolation. All episodes of the show except for the grand finale had been filmed prior to the production's suspension, with the finale having been scheduled to film within hours of the shut down.

Panellists and host

Lindsay Lohan did not return to the judging panel due to the COVID-19 pandemic and Australia's travel restrictions. She was replaced by a new panellist, comedian Urzila Carlson.

The returning judging panel consisted of radio personality Jackie O, singer-songwriter Dannii Minogue and comedian Dave Hughes. Osher Günsberg returned to host the show.

Contestants
In the second season, there were 12 contestants who competed in the competition. Before the season began, Network Ten revealed that the cast included Hollywood actors, a "big name" from an Emmy Award winning television series, Logie Award winners, chart-toppers and a triple Olympian who is a top 10 world-ranked athlete. They further revealed the cast amassing a combined 22 platinum records, 11 gold records, 13 ARIA Awards and two World Cups.

Episodes

Episode 1 (10 August)

Episode 2 (11 August)

Episode 3 (17 August)

Episode 4 (18 August)

Episode 5 (24 August)
 Group number: "Can't Stop the Feeling!" by Justin Timberlake

Episode 6 (25 August)
 Group number: "Came Here for Love" by Sigala & Ella Eyre

Episode 7 (31 August)

Episode 8 (1 September)

Episode 9 (7 September)
 Group number: "This City" by Sam Fischer

Episode 11 (14 September) — Finale
Because of COVID-19 shutdown, the judges had to be in different states, with Dannii and Dave in-studio in Melbourne, Jackie in Sydney alongside Osher and Urzila in New Zealand.
 Group number: "Together" by Sia

Reception

Ratings

See also

List of Australian television series
 The Masked Singer Franchise
It Takes Two
Australian Idol
Australia's Got Talent

References

External links
 
 
 

The Masked Singer (Australian TV series)
2020 Australian television seasons